A proxy wedding or proxy marriage is a wedding in which one or both of the individuals being united are not physically present, usually being represented instead by other persons. If both partners are absent a double proxy wedding occurs.

Marriage by proxy is usually resorted to either when a couple wish to marry but one or both partners cannot attend for reasons such as military service, imprisonment, or travel restrictions; or when a couple lives in a jurisdiction in which they cannot legally marry.

In most jurisdictions, both parties to a marriage must be physically present, and proxy weddings are not recognized as legally binding. Under the English common law, however, if a proxy marriage is valid by the law of the place where the marriage was celebrated (the lex loci celebrationis) then it will be recognised in England and Wales.

History

Starting in the Middle Ages, European monarchs and nobility sometimes married by proxy. Some examples of this include:

 Henry IV to Joanna of Navarre, the daughter of Charles d'Évreux, King of Navarre, on April 2, 1402
 Lorenzo de'Medici to Clarice Orsini in 1469
 Catherine of Aragon to Prince Arthur in 1501
 Margaret Tudor to James IV, in 1503
 Mary Tudor, Queen of France to Louis XII, in 1514
 Anne of Austria to Louis XIII on October 18, 1615
 Charles I of England to Henrietta Maria of France on May 1, 1625
 Marie Antoinette to Louis-Auguste on April 19, 1770
 Napoleon I of France to Austrian Archduchess Marie Louise in 1810

In 1490, Maximilian of Habsburg (the future Holy Roman Emperor, Maximilian I) married Anne of Brittany by proxy, and was represented at the wedding by Wolfgang von Polheim. As part of the symbolism of the proxy wedding, on the wedding night Polheim went to bed with Anne but wore a full suit of armour apart from on his right leg and hand. A sword was placed between them in the bed.

Further, a famous 17th-century painting by Peter Paul Rubens depicts the proxy marriage of Marie de' Medici in 1600. By the end of the 19th century the practice had largely died out.

Many proxy marriages were carried out during the First and Second World Wars, with soldiers at the front marrying women at home, often participating in the wedding via telephone. During the First World War, proxy marriage was permitted in Belgium, France, Germany, Norway, Czechoslovakia and Italy. On 4 April 1915 proxy marriage was legalised in France.

Proxy marriage was common in the US, UK, Soviet Union and Nazi Germany during the Second World War, where obtaining leave to return home and marry was difficult or impossible. Kansas City, Kansas was known for its permissive proxy marriage laws; one lawyer in the city participated in 39 proxy weddings.

In Italy between 1945 and 1976, 12,000 women were married by proxy to Italian Australian men; they would then travel to Australia to meet their new husbands.

Today 
, various Internet sites offer to arrange proxy and double-proxy marriages for a fee, although the service can generally be set up by any lawyer in a jurisdiction that offers proxy marriage. Video conferencing allows couples to experience the ceremony together. A unique "space wedding" took place on August 10, 2003 when Ekaterina Dmitriev, an American citizen living in the U.S. state of Texas where the ceremony was performed, married Yuri Malenchenko, a cosmonaut, who was orbiting the Earth in the International Space Station, by proxy.

Legality

Gambia
Proxy marriage is legal in The Gambia under sharia law.

United States
In the United States, proxy marriages are provided for in law or by customary practice in Texas, Colorado, Kansas, and Montana. Of these, Montana is the only state that allows double-proxy marriage. Proxy marriages cannot be solemnized in any other U.S. states.

In 1924, a federal court recognized the proxy marriage of a resident of Portugal, where proxy marriages were recognized at the time, and a resident of Pennsylvania, where common-law marriages could be contracted at the time. The Portuguese woman was allowed to immigrate to the United States on account of the marriage, whereas she would have been inadmissible otherwise due to being illiterate.

During the early 1900s, United States proxy marriages increased significantly when many Japanese picture brides arrived at Angel Island, California. Since the early 20th century, it has been most commonly used in the United States for marriages where one partner is a member of the military on active duty. In California, proxy marriage is only available to deployed military personnel. In Montana, a double-proxy marriage is available if at least one partner is either on active military duty or is a Montana resident. In the United states if a proxy marriage has been performed in a state that legally allows it many states will recognize it fully or will recognize it as a common law marriage. An exception to this is the state of Iowa, where it is completely unrecognized.

Germany
Germany does not allow proxy marriages within its jurisdiction (§ 1311 BGB). It recognizes proxy marriages contracted elsewhere where this is possible, subject to the usual rules of private international law, unless the foreign law should be incompatible with German ordre public (art. 6 EGBGB): this is not the case with the marriage by proxy per se, but would be if, e. g., the proxy was held responsible for choosing the spouse without further asking rather than only contracting a marriage with a given spouse.

United Kingdom

Proxy marriage was argued for in the House of Commons by Jennie Adamson in 1943.

In 2014 it was reported that "proxy marriage misuse" was common in the UK, in which an EU citizen and non-EU citizen, both living in the UK, participated in a proxy marriage in an outside country. These were sham marriages which allowed one spouse to gain EU citizenship.

Citizens Advice Scotland warns that "It may be extremely difficult to prove that a marriage by proxy is a valid marriage, both legally and for claiming benefits."

Catholic Church
Catholic Canon Law permits marriage by proxy, but requires officiants to receive authorization from the local ordinary before proceeding.

References

External links
 Operation ‘I Do’: Moody AFB Attorneys Help Couple Tie Knot
 Ernest G. Lorenzen, "Marriage By Proxy and the Conflict of Laws" (1932)
 Double Proxy Marriage in Montana (limited to Montana residents and active duty military personnel, all branches)

Types of marriage